Site-directed mutagenesis is a molecular biology method that is used to make specific and intentional mutating changes to the DNA sequence of a gene and any gene products. Also called site-specific mutagenesis or oligonucleotide-directed mutagenesis, it is used for investigating the structure and biological activity of DNA, RNA, and protein molecules, and for protein engineering.

Site-directed mutagenesis is one of the most important laboratory techniques for creating DNA libraries by introducing mutations into DNA sequences. There are numerous methods for achieving site-directed mutagenesis, but with decreasing costs of oligonucleotide synthesis, artificial gene synthesis is now occasionally used as an alternative to site-directed mutagenesis. Since 2013, the development of the CRISPR/Cas9 technology, based on a prokaryotic viral defense system, has also allowed for the editing of the genome, and mutagenesis may be performed in vivo with relative ease.

History
Early attempts at mutagenesis using radiation or chemical mutagens were non-site-specific, generating random mutations.  Analogs of nucleotides and other chemicals were later used to generate localized point mutations, examples of such chemicals are aminopurine, nitrosoguanidine, and bisulfite.  Site-directed mutagenesis was achieved in 1974 in the laboratory of Charles Weissmann using a nucleotide analogue N4-hydroxycytidine, which induces transition of GC to AT. These methods of mutagenesis, however, are limited by the kind of mutation they can achieve, and they are not as specific as later site-directed mutagenesis methods.

In 1971, Clyde Hutchison and Marshall Edgell showed that it is possible to produce mutants with small fragments of phage ϕX174 and restriction nucleases. Hutchison later produced with his collaborator Michael Smith in 1978 a more flexible approach to site-directed mutagenesis by using oligonucleotides in a primer extension method with DNA polymerase.  For his part in the development of this process, Michael Smith later shared the Nobel Prize in Chemistry in October 1993 with Kary B. Mullis, who invented polymerase chain reaction.

Basic mechanism
The basic procedure requires the synthesis of a short DNA primer.  This synthetic primer contains the desired mutation and is complementary to the template DNA around the mutation site so it can hybridize with the DNA in the gene of interest.  The mutation may be a single base change (a point mutation), multiple base changes, deletion, or insertion.  The single-strand primer is then extended using a DNA polymerase, which copies the rest of the gene. The gene thus copied contains the mutated site, and is then introduced into a host cell in a vector and cloned. Finally, mutants are selected by DNA sequencing to check that they contain the desired mutation.

Approaches

The original method using single-primer extension was inefficient due to a low yield of mutants.  This resulting mixture contains both the original unmutated template as well as the mutant strand, producing a mixed population of mutant and non-mutant progenies. Furthermore, the template used is methylated while the mutant strand is unmethylated, and the mutants may be counter-selected due to presence of mismatch repair system that favors the methylated template DNA, resulting in fewer mutants.  Many approaches have since been developed to improve the efficiency of mutagenesis.

A large number of methods are available to effect site-directed mutagenesis, although most of them have rarely been used in laboratories since the early 2000s, as newer techniques allow for simpler and easier ways of introducing site-specific mutation into genes.

Kunkel's method 
In 1985, Thomas Kunkel introduced a technique that reduces the need to select for the mutants. The DNA fragment to be mutated is inserted into a phagemid such as M13mp18/19 and is then transformed into an E. coli strain deficient in two enzymes, dUTPase (dut) and uracil deglycosidase (udg). Both enzymes are part of a DNA repair pathway that protects the bacterial chromosome from mutations by the spontaneous deamination of dCTP to dUTP. The dUTPase deficiency prevents the breakdown of dUTP, resulting in a high level of dUTP in the cell. The uracil deglycosidase deficiency prevents the removal of uracil from newly synthesized DNA. As the double-mutant E. coli replicates the phage DNA, its enzymatic machinery may, therefore, misincorporate dUTP instead of dTTP, resulting in single-strand DNA that contains some uracils (ssUDNA). The ssUDNA is extracted from the bacteriophage that is released into the medium, and then used as template for mutagenesis.  An oligonucleotide containing the desired mutation is used for primer extension. The heteroduplex DNA, that forms, consists of one parental non-mutated strand containing dUTP and a mutated strand containing dTTP.  The DNA is then transformed into an E. coli strain carrying the wildtype dut and udg genes. Here, the uracil-containing parental DNA strand is degraded, so that nearly all of the resulting DNA consists of the mutated strand.

Cassette mutagenesis
Unlike other methods, cassette mutagenesis need not involve primer extension using DNA polymerase.  In this method, a fragment of DNA is synthesized, and then inserted into a plasmid. It involves the cleavage by a restriction enzyme at a site in the plasmid and subsequent ligation of a pair of complementary oligonucleotides containing the mutation in the gene of interest to the plasmid. Usually, the restriction enzymes that cut at the plasmid and the oligonucleotide are the same, permitting sticky ends of the plasmid and insert to ligate to one another.  This method can generate mutants at close to 100% efficiency, but is limited by the availability of suitable restriction sites flanking the site that is to be mutated.

PCR site-directed mutagenesis

The limitation of restriction sites in cassette mutagenesis may be overcome using polymerase chain reaction with oligonucleotide "primers", such that a larger fragment may be generated, covering two convenient restriction sites.  The exponential amplification in PCR produces a fragment containing the desired mutation in sufficient quantity to be separated from the original, unmutated plasmid by gel electrophoresis, which may then be inserted in the original context using standard recombinant molecular biology techniques.  There are many variations of the same technique.  The simplest method places the mutation site toward one of the ends of the fragment whereby one of two oligonucleotides used for generating the fragment contains the mutation.  This involves a single step of PCR, but still has the inherent problem of requiring a suitable restriction site near the mutation site unless a very long primer is used.  Other variations, therefore, employ three or four oligonucleotides, two of which may be non-mutagenic oligonucleotides that cover two convenient restriction sites and generate a fragment that can be digested and ligated into a plasmid, whereas the mutagenic oligonucleotide may be complementary to a location within that fragment well away from any convenient restriction site.  These methods require multiple steps of PCR so that the final fragment to be ligated can contain the desired mutation. The design process for generating a fragment with the desired mutation and relevant restriction sites can be cumbersome. Software tools like SDM-Assist can simplify the process.

Whole plasmid mutagenesis
For plasmid manipulations, other site-directed mutagenesis techniques have been supplanted largely by techniques that are highly efficient but relatively simple, easy to use, and commercially available as a kit.  An example of these techniques is the Quikchange method, wherein a pair of complementary mutagenic primers are used to amplify the entire plasmid in a thermocycling reaction using a high-fidelity non-strand-displacing DNA polymerase such as pfu polymerase.  The reaction generates a nicked, circular DNA.   The template DNA must be eliminated by enzymatic digestion with a restriction enzyme such as DpnI, which is specific for methylated DNA.  All DNA produced from most Escherichia coli strains would be methylated; the template plasmid that is biosynthesized in E. coli will, therefore, be digested, while the mutated plasmid, which is generated in vitro and is therefore unmethylated, would be left undigested. Note that, in these double-strand plasmid mutagenesis methods, while the thermocycling reaction may be used, the DNA need not be exponentially amplified as in a PCR. Instead, the amplification is linear, and it is therefore inaccurate to describe them as a PCR, since there is no chain reaction.

Note that pfu polymerase can become strand-displacing at higher extension temperature (≥70 °C) which can result in the failure of the experiment, therefore the extension reaction should be performed at the recommended temperature of 68 °C.  In some applications, this method has been observed to lead to insertion of multiple copies of primers. A variation of this method, called SPRINP, prevents this artifact and has been used in different types of site directed mutagenesis.

Other techniques such as scanning mutagenesis of oligo-directed targets (SMOOT) can semi-randomly combine mutagenic oligonucleotides in plasmid mutagenesis. This technique can create plasmid mutagenesis libraries ranging from single mutations to comprehensive codon mutagenesis across an entire gene.

In vivo site-directed mutagenesis methods
Delitto perfetto
Transplacement "pop-in pop-out"
Direct gene deletion and site-specific mutagenesis with PCR and one recyclable marker
Direct gene deletion and site-specific mutagenesis with PCR and one recyclable marker using long homologous regions
In vivo site-directed mutagenesis with synthetic oligonucleotides

CRISPR 

Since 2013, the development of CRISPR-Cas9 technology has allowed for the efficient introduction of various mutations into the genome of a wide variety of organisms. The method does not require a transposon insertion site, leaves no marker, and its efficiency and simplicity has made it the preferred method for genome editing.

Applications

Site-directed mutagenesis is used to generate mutations that may produce a rationally designed protein that has improved or special properties (i.e.protein engineering).

Investigative tools – specific mutations in DNA allow the function and properties of a DNA sequence or a protein to be investigated in a rational approach. Furthermore, single amino-acid changes by site-directed mutagenesis in proteins can help understand the importance of post-translational modifications. For instance changing a particular serine (phosphoacceptor) to an alanine (phospho-non-acceptor) in a substrate protein blocks the attachment of a phosphate group, thereby allows the phosphorylation to be investigated. This approach has been used to uncover the phosphorylation of the protein CBP by the kinase HIPK2 Another comprehensive approach is site saturation mutagenesis where one codon or a set of codons may be substituted with all possible amino acids at the specific positions.

Commercial applications – Proteins may be engineered to produce mutant forms that are tailored for a specific application.  For example, commonly used laundry detergents may contain subtilisin, whose wild-type form has a methionine that can be oxidized by bleach, significantly reducing the activity the protein in the process. This methionine may be replaced by alanine or other residues, making it resistant to oxidation thereby keeping the protein active in the presence of bleach.

Gene synthesis 

As the cost of DNA oligonucleotides synthesis falls, artificial synthesis of a complete gene is now a viable method for introducing mutation into gene. This method allows for extensive mutagenesis over multiples sites, including the complete redesign of the codon usage of gene to optimise it for a particular organism.

See also
 Directed mutagenesis
 Phi value analysis

References

External links

 Nobel Lecture on Invention of Site-Directed Mutagenesis
 OpenWetWare
 Diagram summarizing site-directed mutagenesis

Genetics techniques
Molecular genetics
Mutagenesis
Protein engineering